Lo smemorato di Collegno (Italian for "The Collegno amnesiac") is a 1962 commedia all'italiana film directed by Sergio Corbucci. It is loosely based on the Bruneri-Canella case.

Plot 
A man is hospitalized in a neurological clinic, due to a memory loss. After the publication of his photography on a newspaper three people claim to have recognized him: Miss Ballarini and Miss Polacich, who both claim that he is their husband, and a fraudster, who accuses the amnesiac  of being his  disappeared accomplice.

Cast 

Totò: The Amnesiac
Nino Taranto: Professor Ademaro Gioberti
Erminio Macario: Nicola Politi
Aroldo Tieri: Dr. Alessandro Zannini
Andrea Checchi: Lawyer Rossetti
Yvonne Sanson: Linda Ballarini
Franco Volpi: Prosecutor
Mario Pisu:  Ballarini's Lawyer
Elvy Lissiak: Miss Polacich
Riccardo Billi: Fernando Meniconi
Enrico Viarisio: Minister 
Franco Giacobini: Journalist
Gisella Sofio: Milanese Journalist
Pietro Carloni: Francesco Ballerini
Mario Castellani: Giorgio Ballerini
Consalvo Dell'Arti: Natale
Gianni Rizzo: Accountant
Antonio Acqua: President of the Tribunal
Mimmo Poli: Man-Bench
Franco Ressel: Publicist

References

External links

1962 films
Films directed by Sergio Corbucci
Italian comedy films
1962 comedy films
Commedia all'italiana
Films about amnesia
Films with screenplays by Giovanni Grimaldi
Collegno
1960s Italian-language films
1960s Italian films